Phrynobatrachus minutus is a species of frog in the family Phrynobatrachidae. It is endemic to Ethiopia and occurs in the central and southern parts of the country on both sides of the Rift Valley; its range may extend south to Kenya, perhaps further. Some earlier records from Ethiopia represent Phrynobatrachus inexpectatus, described as a new species in 2001. The specific name minutus refers to the small size of this frog. Common names tiny river frog and Ethiopian dwarf puddle frog have been coined for it.

Description
Adult males measure  and adult females  in snout–vent length. The tympanum is present but usually hidden, although it may sometimes just visible through the skin. The toes have feeble webbing and may have weakly developed discs. Dorsal skin is smooth or may have warts that can even be prominent, especially on the upper flanks, posterior back, and hind limbs. Alcohol-preserved specimens are dorsally pale to dark grey-brown or yellow-brown. In life, adult males have bright yellow throat.

Habitat and conservation
Breeding takes place in water. It is a quite common species where suitable habitat is present. Habitat degradation, caused in particular by agricultural expansion, human settlement, and overgrazing, is a threat to it. It is present in the Bale Mountains National Park, and probably in other protected areas as well.

References

minutus
Frogs of Africa
Amphibians of Ethiopia
Endemic fauna of Ethiopia
Taxa named by George Albert Boulenger
Amphibians described in 1895
Taxonomy articles created by Polbot